Pierre-André Chiappori is a French-Monégasque economist currently E. Rowan and Barbara Steinschneider Professor of Economics at Columbia University. His research focuses on household behavior, general equilibrium and mathematical economics.

Education 
Chiappori studied at École normale supérieure (Paris) between 1974 and 1979. During that period, he also studied at various Parisian universities, receiving degrees in mathematics, statistics, and economics. He graduated with a Ph.D. in economics from the University Paris I in 1981.

Career 
Chiappori's first academic post was as an assistant professor at his alma mater, University Paris I. He then became a Maître de conférences at the Ecole des Hautes Etudes en Sciences Sociales in 1985, followed by an appointment at the CNRS and the Ecole Polytechnique. The ENSAE appointed him to professor of economics in 1992, he held this post while also being a senior researcher at the CNRS. He left France for a professorship at the University of Chicago in 1997, and took up his current position at Columbia University in 2005, after a year-long stay at the same university as a visiting professor.

He has served various journals in an editorial capacity, such as the Review of Economics of the Household, the Journal of Political Economy and the Journal of the European Economic Association.

He was elected fellow of the Econometric Society and the European Economic Association in 1995 and 2004, respectively. In 2015 he was made fellow of the Society for the Advancement of Economic Theory.

Selected works

References

External links 

 Webpage at the website of Columbia University

French economists
Monacan people
Columbia University faculty
Mathematical economists
École Normale Supérieure alumni
Paris Diderot University alumni
Pantheon-Sorbonne University alumni
Research directors of the French National Centre for Scientific Research
University of Chicago faculty
Academic staff of the School for Advanced Studies in the Social Sciences
Academic staff of École Polytechnique
Fellows of the Econometric Society
Year of birth missing (living people)
Living people
Fellows of the European Economic Association
21st-century Native Americans
Journal of Political Economy editors